Man v. Monster is a British documentary television series broadcast on Nat Geo Wild, which follows adventurer and cinematographer Richard Terry as he travels back in time to faraway jungles and remote islands in search of the truth behind stories of unknown creatures attacking, and killing, humans. In the Amazon rainforest, Terry is on the trail of a huge spider said to be attacking villagers; in southern Mexico, reports of a terrifying creature that attacks locals at night sends Terry into the jungles of Chiapas to investigate; and in the Indonesian archipelago, Terry island hops to expose a giant, blood-thirsty reptile that preys on livestock and humans.

Seasons Overview

Episodes

Series 1 (2011)

Series 2 (2012)

Series 3 (2013)

References

2011 British television series debuts
2013 British television series endings
British television documentaries
National Geographic (American TV channel) original programming
Documentary films about nature
Nature educational television series